This article shows a list of railway stations in the Free Hanseatic City of Bremen. The list is divided into the two cities composing this federal state: Bremen and Bremerhaven.

Railway stations

Bremen
Bremen Hauptbahnhof
Bremen-Arbergen
Bremen-Aumund
Bremen-Blumenthal
Bremen-Burg
Bremen-Farge
Bremen-Farge Ost
Bremen Föhrenstraße
Bremen-Hemelingen
Bremen Kreinsloger
Bremen-Lesum
Bremen-Mahndorf
Bremen Mühlenstraße
Bremen-Neustadt
Bremen-Oberneuland
Bremen-Oslebshausen
Bremen-Schönebeck
Bremen Schwanewede Löhstraße
Bremen-Sebaldsbrück
Bremen-St. Magnus
Bremen Turnerstraße
Bremen-Vegesack
Bremen-Walle

Bremerhaven
Bremerhaven Hauptbahnhof
Bremerhaven-Lehe
Bremerhaven-Speckenbüttel
Bremerhaven-Wulsdorf

See also
Bremen S-Bahn
Railway stations in Germany

External links

 
Brem
Rail